Akvo Foundation is a non-profit internet and software development foundation, headquartered in Amsterdam, Netherlands. The foundation specializes primarily in building and operating data collection and visualization systems, to be used in international development and aid activity. Akvo also operates the sustainable development wiki-inspired Akvopedia, which as of 2017, has one-thousand nine hundred fifty six content pages about water, sanitation, and agriculture. Akvo was initially started as a project under the Netherlands Water Partnership in 2006.

Akvo operates from 11 offices worldwide; it has hub offices based in a number of different locations, including Stockholm, London, Washington, DC, Nairobi, and New Delhi. As of 2017, Akvo operates in 93 countries and works with more than 1,800 organizations around the world from NGOs to national governments and multilateral aid organizations who use Akvo's tools to report, publish, monitor and evaluate their work. Much of the foundation's work is concentrated within the water and sanitation sector. However, since 2010 it has widened its focus to areas such as health, education, technology, agriculture, and economic development.

The foundation's mission is "to build a highly effective, open, online platform, and a trusted partner network."

History 
Thomas Bjelkeman-Pettersson and Jeroen van der Sommen met at the Stockholm World Water Week in 2006. At this time, it was becoming clear that the Millennium Development Goals on water was going to be difficult to achieve and as a result there was the need to develop new ideas. Shortly thereafter, the idea of using open source software and open data for the development sector was developed. Consequently, in 2008 the Akvo Foundation was formed by the Netherlands Water Partnership and several other co founders, including Bjelkeman-Pettersson and van der Sommen as well as Mark Nitzberg, Mark Charmer, Gabriel von Heijne and Peter van der Linde.

 Early timeline

September 2006 - Seed funding is provided by Netherlands Water Partnership (NWP). The partner organizations that participate in brainstorming about what Akvo should become are UNESCO-IHE, IRC International Resource Centre for Water and Sanitation (IRC) and the Movement Design Bureau.

April 2007 – Partners for Water and NWP provide the first batch of funding.

August 2007 – Akvopedia is shown for the first time at World Water Week.

In 2015, Akvo was named as the winner of the Water and Sanitation Award. The award was in recognition of Akvo's innovation within the water and sanitation sector in Latin America. Also, in November 2015, Akvo was awarded the Dutch Water Innovation Prize. Akvo won the award for the development of a smart irrigation inlet sensor that measures the salinity of surface water.

Products and services 
Akvo designs and builds Software as a Service software as well as offering services that complement them, such as training and consulting. All Akvo's software is released as open source software. Akvo's tools are designed to work together at each stage of the monitoring cycle and therefore have three main purposes: first, capture and collect data;  second, understand this data and turn it into decisions; and third, share this data. Organ that use Akvo services include UNDP, UNICEF and a number of other NGOs and governments.

Akvo Flow (Field Level Operation Watch) allows field surveys to be managed and carried out using mobile phones. It can be used to collect, manage, analyse and display geographically-referenced monitoring and evaluation data. Flow was originally developed by Water for People. In 2012 Water for People partnered with Akvo to allow for wider use of the system and Akvo took over the development of Flow. Initially Flow was used primarily in water and sanitation projects, but has more recently been used in a variety of fields, including fisheries management, school management  and disaster relief. Since 2010, 3.990.763 data points have been captured with Flow.

Akvo RSR (Really Simple Reporting) was launched in September 2008  and was the first product Akvo developed; it is a content management and reporting system for international development projects. It was described by Giulio Quaggiotto of the World Bank as "Real-time, paper-free, straight from the trenches reporting. If RSR takes off, it could be the killer application of Development 2.0". There are now over 4000 projects on the platform, with a combined value of over €150 billion.

Akvopedia was created in 2007 and was the first project that Akvo worked on. It is a Web-based, free content, water and sanitation knowledge resource. Akvopedia is written collaboratively by volunteers and specialists, mainly from the water and sanitation sector but anyone can edit and contribute. It is organised within five portals – Water, Sanitation, Finance, Sustainability and Decision & assessment tools. Recently some of this content has been transferred to Wikiversity in the Rainwater Harvesting portal.

Akvo Sites is a WordPress based system for easy creation and maintenance of websites.

Akvo Caddisfly is a water quality and soil quality testing system based on smartphones. Akvo Caddisfly was originally invented by Ternup Research Labs to detect the precedes of fluoride in drinking water. Ternup joined forces with Akvo in early 2014. The Caddisfly system has been extended to work with strip tests and phone-connected sensors as well as the original colorimetric tests.

Akvo Lumen is a data visualisation platform and is Akvo's latest product. It is developed in the Clojure programming language.

Innovative communication 
Akvo has gained notoriety for its unique external communication. Bruce Sterling said "It's an open-source sanitation project, and if that isn’t weird enough, they’ve got a Bollywood-parody promotional angle."

National Geographic Society reported from World Water Week in Stockholm about the WaterCube, the brainchild of Mark Charmer at Akvo: "Man-on-the-street journalism meets wonky water week. Frenetic water cube workers ushered a steady stream of conference attendees into their fishbowl lounge for quick Flip camera interviews. The close-ups may not be flattering, but it is interesting to hear the stream of consciousness that pours from the mouths of the unprepared and unedited. From high-profile corporate and academic leadership to those implementing projects on the ground around the world, the resulting online mosaic of more than 200 interviews collected over the last two years seems to present a near-complete view of the issues covered over six days of workshops, plenary sessions, and panels."

Recent notable projects and partnerships 
Akvopedia expands into Wikiversity: In 2015, Akvopedia begun loading content into Wikiversity. Akvopedia has served as source content for the Wikiversity portal and the Rainwater harvesting portal.

Monitoring water points during drought in Ethiopia: In 2016, Akvo worked with UNICEF to collect data during the worst drought in over 50 years in Ethiopia. Akvo recorded over 80,000 survey responses which were used to help direct emergency resources to the most relevant areas.

Supporting Government disaster planning and response systems: Since 2014, Akvo has worked in Fiji, Vanuatu and the Solomon Islands to introduce locally run mobile-based data and asset management tools to improve the quality and availability of data for disaster-related decision-making.  For this work Akvo won the innovationXchange award. In 2016, Akvo Flow was used in Fiji to collect data on the extent of the damage caused by Cyclone Winston.

References

Appropriate technology organizations
Appropriate technology
International sustainability organizations
Internet properties established in 2008
MediaWiki websites
Semantic wikis
Sustainable design
Software using the GNU AGPL license